William Townsend may refer to:

William Townsend (mayor) (1821–1882), Australian politician
William Townsend (cricketer) (1821–1891), English cricketer and barrister
William Townsend (Oneida County, NY) (1848–1919), New York politician
William A. Townsend (1904–1993), British philatelist
William Cameron Townsend (1896–1982), American Christian missionary
William Charles Townsend (1803–1850), English barrister and writer
William George Paulson Townsend (1868–1941), English artist, designer and writer
William H. Townsend (1812–1873), former Nova Scotia political figure
William John Townsend (1835–1915), British Methodist minister
William Kneeland Townsend (1849–1907), U.S. federal judge
William Richard Townsend (died 1914), British lawyer and colonial administrator
William T. Townsend, founder and CEO of Barrett Technology
Bill Townsend (born 1965), businessman

See also
William Townshend (disambiguation)